Folco Quilici (9 April 1930 – 24 February 2018) was an Italian film director and screenwriter. He directed a total of 22 films between 1952 and his retirement in 2005, including  Tiko and the Shark (it).  His 1955 film L'ultimo paradiso won the Silver Bear in the documentary category at the 7th Berlin International Film Festival.

Death
Quilici died in Orvieto, Italy of a stroke on 24 February 2018 at the age of 87.

References

External links

1930 births
2018 deaths
Italian film directors
20th-century Italian screenwriters
Italian male screenwriters
Centro Sperimentale di Cinematografia alumni
Underwater photographers
People from Ferrara